Igor Romanovich Lifanov (born 25 December 1965) is Russian actor of theater, cinema and TV.

Biography
Igor Lifanov born December 25, 1965, in the Ukrainian Soviet Socialist Republic, in the city of Mykolayiv.

He lived in the city of Mykolayiv, where he graduated from school, then served in the Navy in the Far East.

He entered the Saint Petersburg State Theatre Arts Academy, from which he graduated in 1992, diploma work An Ardent Heart, after which he was invited to Tovstonogov Bolshoi Drama Theater. In 2003, he left the theater.

Personal life
His first marriage with Elena Pavlikova was at the institute and ended after 3 months. A second marriage to actress Tatyana Aptikeeva lasted 13 years, but also ended in divorce. That marriage produced a daughter, Anastasia. He married Elena Kosenko in September 2011, after being in a relationship for 9 years. They have a daughter.

Filmography 

1991: Labeled as underground man
1997: Brother as bandit on the kitchen 
1998: Streets of Broken Lights (TV Series) as Slavin
1999-2000: National Security Agent 1-2 (TV Series) as Sasha Lufar
2000: Deadly Force (TV Series) as Anokhin
2001: The Romanovs: An Imperial Family (TV Series) as Sergey Mstislavsky
2002: Letters to Elsa as Aleksei
2002: Spetsnaz (TV Mini-Series) as Khrustalyov  
2003: District (TV Series) as felon
2004: Huntsman   as  Vasily Klintsov
2004: Night Watch (2004) as Parrot (uncredited)
2005: The Last Battle of Major Pugachev as Pugachev
2006: Hunting for Red Deer as Kalyagin
2006: Day Watch as Parrot 
2006: Fucked up as Valentin
2006: Break-through as Capt. Fyodor Stozharov
2006: Paradise as Nikolay Zvyagin
2007: Full Breath as Stepan
2007: The Guide  as Pavel Shnyrev
2009: Trap for the Killer as Alexander Melnikov
2009: The Taming of the Shrew as Mikhalych
2009: Attack on Leningrad as Gorkin
2009: Wild as captain Alexander Dichenko
2009: True Love as Vasily
2010: Justice Wolves as Young Investigator
2012: Nowhere Man (Short) as Sergey Kutepov
2014: Dangerous Love as Ivan Zolotaryov
2014: Bull and Spindle as   Bull 
2020: Something for Nothing (Short) as Ray Hicks

References

External links
 
 
 Igor Lifanov actor: photos, awards and reviews

1965 births
Living people
Russian male film actors
Actors from Mykolaiv
Russian male television actors
Russian male stage actors